Elizabeth Maria Peña (September 23, 1959 – October 14, 2014) was an American actress, writer and musician. Her work in films included Nothing like the Holidays, Batteries Not Included,  La Bamba, Down and Out in Beverly Hills, Jacob's Ladder, Rush Hour, The Incredibles, and Lone Star, for which she won the 1996 Independent Spirit Award for Best Supporting Female and a Bravo Award for Outstanding Actress in a Feature Film. She was also a founding member of the Hispanic Organization of Latin Actors. Peña also voiced Rosa Santos in Maya and Miguel.

Early life
Peña was born on September 23, 1959, in Elizabeth, New Jersey and raised by her Cuban immigrant parents. Her father, Mario, was a playwright, director, actor, and designer in their native Cuba, who opened up the Latin American Theatre Ensemble after establishing a life for him and his family in New York.  In 1975, she was a founding member of the Hispanic Organization of Latin Actors. In 1977, she graduated from New York's High School of Performing Arts. Ving Rhames and Esai Morales were her classmates, who would later star with her in Jacob's Ladder, La Bamba, and Resurrection Blvd.

Career

In 1979, Peña made her film debut in El Super, a "moving and melancholy comedy about a family of lower middle class Cuban refugees attempting to adjust to life in Spanish Harlem". She worked once again with director Leon Ichaso in his next feature, Crossover Dreams. She appeared in films such as Nothing like the Holidays, La Bamba, Down and Out in Beverly Hills, Jacob's Ladder, Lone Star, *batteries not included, Blue Steel, 1997's "Gridlock'd" as ER Admissions Person (under the name Elizabeth Anne Dickinson), Vibes, and Rush Hour. In 2002, she starred in Showtime's Resurrection Blvd. as Tia Bibi Corrades in the episode "Justicia", which she also directed. In 2003, she appeared in and directed "It Was Fun While It Lasted", an episode of The Brothers Garcia. Peña also voiced Mirage in Pixar's animated film The Incredibles. She guest starred in the 18th episode of season 2 of Numb3rs as Sonya Benavides, and in season 4 of Modern Family as Pilar, the Colombian mother of Gloria Pritchett. Although she spoke Spanish, she did not dub her own voice for Spanish releases. Peña was also noted for having starred in I Married Dora, a sitcom in 1987, as Dora Calderon, the title character. She also starred in John Sayles's produced critically acclaimed but short-lived television series Shannon's Deal (1989–1991). In 1996, Sayles wrote and directed the mystery film Lone Star and again cast her in a co-starring role, for which she won the 1996 Independent Spirit Award for Best Supporting Actress and a Bravo Award for Outstanding Actress in a Feature Film from the National Council of La Raza.

Personal life and death
Peña married William Stephan Kibler in 1988. Their marriage later ended in divorce. In 1994, Peña married Hans Rolla, with whom she had two children, Joey and Kaelan.

Peña died on October 14, 2014, at Cedars-Sinai Medical Center in Los Angeles, California, at the age of 55. The cause of death listed on her death certificate was cirrhosis of the liver due to alcohol, which caused acute gastrointestinal bleeding, cardiogenic shock and cardiac arrest.

Filmography

See also

 List of Cuban Americans

References

External links
 

1959 births
2014 deaths
20th-century American actresses
21st-century American actresses
Actors from Elizabeth, New Jersey
Actresses from New Jersey
Alcohol-related deaths in California
American entertainers of Cuban descent
American film actresses
American stage actresses
American television actresses
American voice actresses
Deaths from cirrhosis
Fiorello H. LaGuardia High School alumni
Hispanic and Latino American actresses
Independent Spirit Award for Best Supporting Female winners